The 1925 U.S. Open was the 29th U.S. Open, held June 3–5 at Worcester Country Club in Worcester, Massachusetts. Scottish pro Willie Macfarlane won the 36-hole playoff by one stroke on the final hole to secure his only major championship and deny Bobby Jones his second Open, which he won the following year.

This was the last year that the first two rounds of the U.S. Open were played on the same day. Francis Ouimet, the 1913 champion, held the lead after the first round on Wednesday morning. Macfarlane tied Leo Diegel for the second round lead after a 67 that established a new tournament record. Macfarlane carded a 72 in the third round that gave him a one-stroke lead over Johnny Farrell. Macfarlane, however, struggled in the final round on Thursday afternoon on his way to a 78 and 291 total. That was still good enough to tie Jones, who shot 74 after a 70 in the morning. Farrell and Ouimet (who was playing in his final Open), shot 78 and 76, respectively, to finish a shot out of the playoff.

The 18-hole playoff on Friday morning ended in a tie, with both Macfarlane and Jones at 75. In the era before sudden-death, another full round was required to break the tie, and it was held that afternoon. Jones took a four-stroke lead after nine, but Macfarlane managed to tie after recording birdies at 10 and 13, while Jones bogeyed 13. The match was still all square heading to the 18th tee. Macfarlane found the green on his approach while Jones hit into a bunker. After Jones failed to get up-and-down, Macfarlane two-putted for the title. Macfarlane was the first Scot to win the Open in fifteen years, since Alex Smith in 1910.

During the first round, Jones was getting set to hit an iron shot out of the rough on the 11th hole when he felt his club move the ball ever so slightly.  No one else seemed to have seen this movement, but Jones called a penalty on himself. After officials were unable to confirm that the ball had actually moved, they allowed Jones to make his own ruling on whether or not he should be penalized. Jones said he was certain the ball had moved and penalized himself. The decision cost him the title, but forever added to Jones's legacy.  Spectators praised him for his sportsmanship, but he would have none of it. He flatly replied, "You might as well praise me for not robbing a bank."  Because there were so many players with a chance on the final nine of regulation and both playoff rounds were drama-filled, William D. Richardson of The New York Times called it "easily the greatest Open Championship of them all."

Past champions in the field 

Source:
 Last year without a cut

Round summaries

First round
Wednesday, June 3, 1925 (morning)

Source:

Second round
Wednesday, June 3, 1925 (afternoon)

Source:

Third round
Thursday, June 4, 1925 (morning)

Source:

Final round
Thursday, June 4, 1925 (afternoon)

Source:

Playoff 
Friday, June 5, 1925

Source:

2nd playoff – (afternoon)

Source:

References

External links

USGA Championship Database
USOpen.com - 1925

U.S. Open
U.S. Open
U.S. Open (golf)
Golf in Massachusetts
Sports competitions in Worcester, Massachusetts
U.S. Open (golf)
U.S. Open (golf)